Antal is a Hungarian given name that is a form of Antonius in use throughout Hungary and in parts of Romania. Notable people with this given name include the following:

First name
Antal Amade de Várkony (1760 – 1835), Hungarian count
Antal Andrássy (1742 – 1799), Hungarian Roman Catholic bishop 
Antal Apró (1913 – 1994), Hungarian politician
Antal Bánhidi (1903 – 1994), Hungarian aviator
Antal Bánkuti (1923 – 2001), Hungarian basketball player
Antal Bartal (1829 — 1909), Hungarian lexicographer and philologist
Antal Benda (1910 – 1997), Hungarian field handball player
Antal Berkes (1874–1938), Hungarian painter
Antal Bodó (born 1958), Hungarian wrestler
Antal Bolvári (1932 – 2019), Hungarian water polo player
Antal Csengery (1822 – 1880), Hungarian historian
Antal Doráti (1906 – 1988), Hungarian-born conductor and composer
Antal Dovcsák (1879–1962), Hungarian politician 
Antal Dunai (born 1943), Hungarian footballer
Antal Festetics (born 1937), Hungarian zoologist
Antal Gábor Hollósi (born 1946), Hungarian physician and politician
Antal Gáborfi (1904 – ???), Hungarian swimmer
Antal Gelley (born 1950), Hungarian rower
Antal Günther (1847 – 1920), Hungarian politician
Antal Hajba (1938 – 2017), Hungarian canoeist
Antal Hetényi (born 1947), Hungarian judoka
Antal Jäkl (born 1971), Hungarian football
Antal Jákli, known as Tony Jákli (born 1958), Hungarian-born physicist
Antal Kagerbauer (1814 – 1872), Transylvanian architect
Antal Kiss (1935–2021), Hungarian walking athlete
Antal Kisteleki (born 1945), Hungarian gymnast
Antal Kocsis (1905 – 1994), Hungarian boxer 
Antal Kotász (1 September 1929 – 6 July 2003) was a Hungarian football
Antal Kovács (born 1972), Hungarian judoka
Antal Lakatos, known as Tony Lakatos (born 1958), Hungarian saxophonist
Anton Lehár (1876 – 1962), Hungarian military officer
Antal Ligeti (1823 - 1890), Hungarian painter
Antal Lippay (1923 – 2003), Hungarian hurdling athlete
Antal Lovas (1884 – ???), Hungarian long-distance athlete
Antal Lyka (1908 – 1976), Hungarian football
Antal Majnek (born 1951), Hungarian Roman Catholic bishop
Antal Megyerdi (1939 – 2013), Hungarian cyclist
Antal Melis (born 1946), Hungarian rower
Antal Moldrich (1934 – 2005), Hungarian pentathlete
Antal Nagy (footballer born 1944) (born 1944), Hungarian footballer
Antal Nagy (footballer, born 1956) (born 1956), Hungarian footballer 
Antal Nagy de Buda (died 1437), Hungarian nobleman
Antal Odri, Hungarian sprinter
Antal Páger (actor) (1899 – 1986), Hungarian film actor
Antal Páger (canoeist), Hungarian canoeist
Antal Papp (1867 – 1945), Austro-Hungarian Roman Catholic bishop
Antal Puhalak (born 1963), Serbian footballer
Antal Pusztai (born 1978), Hungarian musician
Antal Reguly (1819–1858), Hungarian linguist and ethnographer
Antal Ribáry (1924 – 1992), Hungarian composer
Antal Rizmayer (born 1939), Hungarian wrestler
Antal Rogán (born 1972), Hungarian politician
Antal Róka (1927 – 1970), Hungarian walking athlete
Antal Róth (born 1960), Hungarian footballer
Antal Ruprecht (1748-1818), Hungarian chemist
Antal Simon (born 1965), Hungarian footballer
Antal Szkalnitzky (1836 – 1878), Hungarian architect
Antal Stašek (born Antonín Zeman, 1843 – 1931), Czech writer and lawyer
Antal Steer (born 1943), Hungarian wrestler
Antal Stevanecz (1861 – 1921), Slovene writer 
Antal Szabó (1910 – 1972), Hungarian footballer
Antal Szabó, known as Toni Szabó (1894 – ???), Hungarian footballer
Antal Száll (born 1944), Hungarian swimmer
Antal Szalay (1912 - 1960), Hungarian footballer
Antal Szebeny (1886 – 1936), Hungarian rower
Antal Szendey (1915 – 1994), Hungarian rower 
Antal Szentmihályi (born 1939), Hungarian footballer
Antal Szerb (1901 – 1945), Hungarian writer
Antal Tapiška (1928 – 2016), Yugoslav footballer
Antal Újváry (1907 – 1967), Hungarian field handball player
Antal Vágó (1891 – 1944), Hungarian footballer 
Antal van den Bosch (born 1969), Dutch linguist
Antal van der Duim (born 1987), Dutch tennis player
Antal Zalai (born 1981), Hungarian violinist
Antal Zirczy (1898 – 1972), Hungarian fencer

Middle name
Imre Antal Kocsis (born 1948), Hungarian politician
Paul II Anton, Prince Esterházy (1711 – 1762), Hungarian prince

See also

Anal (disambiguation)
Andal (disambiguation)
Anta (disambiguation)
Antar (disambiguation)
Atal (disambiguation)

Notes

Hungarian masculine given names